Odd, a name of Old Norse origin (Oddr), the 11th most common male name in Norway. It is rarely used in other countries, though sometimes appearing in other Nordic countries. In Old Norse the word means sharp end of an arrow or edge of blade.

An Icelandic and Faroese form of the name is Oddur.

Notable people named Odd 
Odd Aalen, statistician
Odd Aukrust, economist
Odd Bull, UN official
Odd Børre, singer
Odd Børretzen, author, illustrator and translator
Odd Christian Eiking, cyclist
Odd Gleditsch, Sr., businessman
Odd Hassel, chemist and Nobel laureate
Odd Iversen, footballer
Odd Lindbäck-Larsen, World War II military officer and concentration camp survivor
Odd Nansen, architect
Odd Nerdrum, painter
Odd Nordstoga, musician
Odd Roger Enoksen, politician
Odd Sagør, politician
Odd Strand, civil servant
Odd Winger journalist, novelist and children's writer
Odd With, politician
Odd Arne Westad, historian
Odd Øyen, Norwegian resistance member and anaesthetist

Fictional characters
Odd Della Robbia, a main character in the French 2D/3D animated television series Code Lyoko and its live-action/CGI sequel Code Lyoko: Evolution
Odd Thomas, the main character in a series of novels by author Dean Koontz

See also 
Even (given name)

Norwegian masculine given names